The RMS Kildonan Castle was a Royal Mail Ship and passenger liner that went into service with Castle Line, and its successor, the Union-Castle Line.  She was built to run the mail route from Southampton, England to Cape Town, South Africa starting in 1900.  However, she began her life early, in December 1899, being requisitioned by the government to carry 3,000 troops to Cape Town at the start of the Boer War, and was temporarily used in South Africa to house POW's.  She returned to England in 1901 for an outfitting to carry passengers and mail.  She was one of nine ships on the England-South Africa run.  At the outbreak of World War I, she replenished the South African Army with arms and ammunition.  She also served as a hospital ship during the Dardanelles Campaign, outfitted with 603 beds, and converted in March 1916 to an armed merchant cruiser.  In January 1917, she took Lord Milner and 51 VIP delegates from England, France and Italy to Murmansk, Russia, on the Petrograd Mission. She then undertook convoy duties in the North Atlantic, returning to her normal South African mail run after the war.

During the Roaring 20's, the Kildonan Castle was one of 38 ships in the Union-Castle Line fleet.  She was retired in 1930.

Footnotes

References
 Hodson, Norman, The Race to the Cape: A Story of the Union Castle-Line, 1857-1977, Hampshire: Navigator, 1995
 Hochschild, Adam, To End All Wars: A Story of Loyalty and Rebellion: 1914-1918, Boston: Houghton, 2011
 Wrench, John Evelyn, Alfred Lord Milner: The Man of No Illusions, London: Eyre & Spottiswoode, 1958
 Marlowe, John, Milner: Apostle of Empire, London: Hamish Hamilton, 1976 
 George, Lloyd, "War Memoirs of David Lloyd George, Vol. III'', III, Boston: Little Brown, 1934–36

External links
 History of the ship: Link
 History as an armed merchant cruiser (AMC): Link
 Nomenclature: Link
 The Castle Line Atlas of South Africa, London: Currie, 1895

1899 ships